Idalus monostidza is a moth of the family Erebidae. It was described by George Hampson in 1916. It is found in Peru.

References

 

monostidza
Moths described in 1916